Wayne Ronald Broad (born 20 June 1956) is a former first-class cricketer who played for Queensland from 1977 to 1987, mostly as a batsman and medium-paced bowler. His son, Ryan, also played cricket for Queensland.

Broad played for Wynnum Manly in Brisbane Grade Cricket and he held the record for the most runs scored for the club until his son surpassed his tally in 2015.

References

External links
Wayne Broad at CricketArchive
Wayne Broad at Cricinfo

Queensland cricketers
Living people
1956 births
Cricketers from Brisbane